Rettbach is a river of Thuringia, Germany.

See also
List of rivers of Thuringia

Rivers of Thuringia
Rivers of Germany